William "Bill" Edgar (born 1944 in Wilmington, North Carolina) is an American apologist and professor  of systematic theology at Westminster Theological Seminary. He has been called by Charles Colson "one of evangelicalism's most valued scholars and apologists".

Biography

Edgar grew up in Paris, New York and Geneva. He studied at Harvard University (Honors B.A. in Music 1966), Westminster Theological Seminary (M.Div. 1969), and the University of Geneva (Dr. Théol. 1993). He served as home missionary of the Orthodox Presbyterian Church, Pennsylvania, 1969–1970. Between 1970 and 1978, he taught at the Brunswick School in Greenwich, Connecticut, and 1979–89 at the Faculté Libre de Théologie Réformée, in Aix-en-Provence, France, where he continues as Professeur Associé.

Since 1989, he has been professor of apologetics at Westminster Theological Seminary. He is also coordinator of the Apologetics Department and director of the Gospel and Culture Project. He was chairman of the faculty until 2010. He is an ordained teaching elder in the Presbyterian Church in America since 1978.

Edgar is married to Barbara Smyth Edgar. They have two children, William Keyes Hill-Edgar and Deborah Boatwright Edgar.

Learned societies, boards and ministries

Edgar is a member of American Musicological Society, the Evangelical Theological Society, the Forum on Music and Christian Scholarship, the American Historical Association and the Society for Ethnomusicology. He is also a senior fellow at the Trinity Forum.

He is president of the Huguenot Fellowship Director of the Gospel & Culture Project and serves on the Institutional Review Board and the Medical Ethics Committee of the Chestnut Hill Hospital. He is a fellow at the Wilberforce Forum and at Colson Center, honors trustee at the Greenwood School, and senior fellow at the Trinity Forum. He is on the editorial advisory committee of La Revue Réformée. He speaks regularly at the Veritas Forum programs. He frequently participates in the China Christian Scholars Association, and often travels to China. He has taught in French-speaking Africa in several countries.

Interests

In his books and articles, Edgar has treated topics such as cultural apologetics, the music of Brahms, the Huguenots, and African-American aesthetics.

Edgar is a jazz pianist and regularly performs an evening concert combined with a lecture on the history of jazz. In 2007, it was recorded live on a double-CD, Heaven in a Nightclub, during a benefit concert for Chesterton House, a Center for Christian Studies at Cornell University. The concert and recording feature Edgar, vocalist Ruth Naomi Floyd, saxophonist Joe Salzano, and bassist John Patitucci. His compositions include La Sainte Victoire, which premiered in Aix-en-Provence, June, 2007. He has also set the Psalms to music in an African mode. He manages a professional jazz band, Renewal.

Bibliography

 Taking Note of Music. London 1986, SPCK
 Reasons of the Heart. 1996, Baker/Hourglass
 La carte protestante. 1997, Labor et Fides
 The Face of Truth: Lifting the Veil. 2001, P & R, 2001
 Truth in All Its Glory: Commending the Reformed Faith. 2004, P & R
 Les dix commandements. 2007, Excelsis
 Christian Apologetics Past and Present: A Primary Source Reader: Volume 1, To 1500. 2009, Crossway
 Beyond the Frame. 2010, Trinity Forum, 2010
 Christian Apologetics Past and Present: A Primary Source Reader: Volume 2, From 1500. 2011, Crossway
 Schaeffer on the Christian Life: Countercultural Spirituality. Forthcoming 2013, Crossway

References

External links

Heaven in a Nightclub: The Roots and Theology of Jazz Combined concert and lecture. Justin Taylor – Between Two Worlds
William Edgar: The Deep Joy of Jazz By Faith Issue Number 11, October 2006

American Calvinist and Reformed theologians
Christian apologists
Calvinist and Reformed philosophers
American Presbyterians
Presbyterian Church in America ministers
Harvard College alumni
University of Geneva alumni
Westminster Theological Seminary alumni
Westminster Theological Seminary faculty
American jazz pianists
American male pianists
1944 births
Living people
People from Wilmington, North Carolina
20th-century Calvinist and Reformed theologians
20th-century American pianists
Jazz musicians from North Carolina
American male jazz musicians
20th-century American male musicians